Bourletiella juanitae is a species of globular springtails, arthropods in the family Bourletiellidae.

References

Collembola
Articles created by Qbugbot
Animals described in 1951